A dead-blow hammer is a specialized mallet helpful in minimizing damage to the struck surface and in controlling striking force, with minimal rebound from the struck surface. The minimal rebound is helpful in avoiding accidental damage to precision work, especially in tight locations and in applications such as maintenance work on hydraulic cylinders.

Description
The head of the dead-blow hammer can be solid or hollow (often partially filled with loose steel shot), which distributes the energy of the strike over a longer period of time and reduces rebound. If a filled hammer head breaks while in use, it is likely to scatter a spray of the loose filler particles in the vicinity. Therefore, use of a traditional hollow dead-blow hammer may be restricted in certain settings, such as a manufacturing clean room, where contamination by foreign material could occur. 

Solid-head dead-blow hammers are usually made of rubber or resilient plastic (such as ultra high molecular weight plastic, UHMW) and rely on the inherent properties of the material to absorb shock and reduce rebound. Commonly constructed of polyurethane, dead-blow hammers regularly appear in solid orange or black. Composite heads and fiberglass handle models are also available, with optional shock-absorbent rubber grips. A variant design omits the handle entirely; the dead-blow head is gripped directly in the hand, for use in tight locations.

Some dead-blow hammers have replaceable striking faces, attached by screwing or pressing them into place on the main body of the hammer. These replaceable inserts allow selection of the appropriate hardness for the striking face to reduce damage to an object being hammered, while optimizing the energy transfer of impact. Also, worn or damaged inserts can be replaced without discarding the entire handtool.

Principle of operation

In a conventional solid-head hammer, the force of the entire solid mass of the head is delivered at the moment of impact. Compared to a conventional hammer of similar weight, a dead-blow hammer conveys less peak force, spread over a longer time.

At the moment the face of the hammer head contacts the surface being struck, the sand or shot within the head is effectively trailing it (due to inertia, it is collected at the opposite end of the head). The force imparted by this additional loose mass within the head is not imparted to the struck surface at the moment of contact. Instead, this force is spread out over some period of time, as the sand or shot descends to fill the "face" end of the head. Such a blow is less "sharp" than that of the conventional hammer and feels more "dead" (less elastic rebound) to the user, hence the name.

Applications
In automotive repair, dead-blow hammers are commonly used for chassis work, dislodging stuck parts and sometimes used for hubcap installation and removal (e.g. knock-off hubs). They can be used to pop out small dents when doing auto body repair. They allow controlled use of impact force when performing engine or transmission repair.

In maintenance of hydraulic machinery and aerospace work, dead-blow hammers are useful in freeing stuck cylinders without damaging their precision-formed surfaces or any nearby bearings.

Dead-blow hammers are used in woodworking to knock joints together or apart without denting the wood pieces being worked on.

In metalworking, a dead-blow hammer can be used to properly seat the workpiece against parallels in a machine vise.

Dead-blow hammers are sometimes used in orthopedic surgical procedures. The tools are also used in telecommunications to form large diameter cables within cable runs.

Deadblow mallets are also used in the installation of commercial and residential slab marble and granite applications.

References

Hammers